The word luz in Hebrew (Hebrew: 'לוז') means nut or almond, and refers to what some Jewish scholars assert is a bone that hosts the soul in the human body. Interpretations disagree as to whether it refers to a bone at the top or bottom of the spine. Some say it refers to the small, almond-shaped bone at the top of the spinal column (the first cervical vertebra, C1 or the Atlas), underneath the brain, on the top of the spine, (the bone where the knot of the tefillin rests). It is about the size of a kernel of barley . Other tradition however identified it with the coccyx, as a bone shaped like almond at the bottom and end of the eighteen vertebrae. The Talmud for example mentions a small bone at the end of the spine, identified as Luz by some. Julius Preuss discusses the Rabbinic views on this and agree that the Luz refer to the coccyx. Similarly, Saul Lieberman also mentioned that the very popular Jewish tradition identified Luz with the end of the spine and understand it to be the coccyx. 

In the Kabbalah tradition, the Zohar states that the luz is the bone in the spine that appears like the head of a snake, implying that is the sacrum at the bottom of the spine, because the sacrum is the only bone in the spine that looks like the head of a snake. The sacrum has similar significance to the luz as a source of resurrection in Egyptian and Greek cultures contemporary to the Zohar and Talmud. The sacrum has a pattern of dimples and shape that appear similar to those of the almond shell.

Jewish traditions teach that this is the bone from which the body will be rebuilt at the time of resurrection, and share the idea that this bone does not decay.  Rabbi Shraga Simmons teaches that destruction of this bone by cremation could prevent resurrection.

Midrash
There is an aggadah (legend) in the Midrash that the Roman Emperor Hadrian asked how man would be revived in the world to come, and Rabbi Joshua Ben Hananiah replied that it would be "From Luz, in the back-bone." "Prove this to me," said Hadrian. Then the Rabbi took Luz, a small bone of the spine, and immersed it in water, but it was not softened; he put it into the fire, but it was not consumed; he put it into a mill, but it could not be pounded; he placed it upon an anvil and struck it with a hammer, but the anvil split and the hammer was broken.

References

External links 
Jewish Encyclopedia article for Luz, by Solomon Schechter and J. Theodor.

Talmudic mythology
Bones of the vertebral column
Book of Ezekiel